The Berowra Waters Ferry is a cable ferry across the Berowra Creek, a tributary of the Hawkesbury River, located in the Berowra Valley National Park, Sydney, Australia. The ferry operates from the community of Berowra Waters on the west bank of the creek, to a landing on the east bank, thus connecting with the road to Berowra Heights.

Description 
The ferry is operated by a private sector operator under contract to Transport for NSW, and is free of tolls. The ferry operates on demand 24 hours a day, 7 days a week, but is closed for maintenance on the second Tuesday of each month from 1200 to 1430.

The Berowra Waters Ferry is one of five cable ferry crossings of the Hawkesbury River system. All the others are across the main channel of the river, comprising in order downstream the Sackville Ferry, Lower Portland Ferry, Webbs Creek Ferry and Wisemans Ferry.

References

External links
 

Cable ferries in Australia
Ferries of New South Wales
Ferry transport in Sydney
Hawkesbury River